FC Azamat Cheboksary was a Russian football team from Cheboksary. It played professionally in 1965–1973 and 1978–1993. Their best result was 6th place in the Zone 2 of the Soviet Second League in 1969.

Team name history
 1965–1977: FC Energiya Cheboksary
 1978–1991: FC Stal Cheboksary
 1992–1993: FC Azamat Cheboksary

References

External links
  Team history at KLISF

Association football clubs established in 1965
Association football clubs disestablished in 1994
Defunct football clubs in Russia
Sport in Cheboksary
1965 establishments in Russia
1994 disestablishments in Russia